Elections were held in Bruce County, Ontario on October 27, 2014 in conjunction with municipal elections across the province.

Bruce County Council
Bruce County Council consists of the mayors of the constituent municipalities.

Arran-Elderslie

Brockton

Huron-Kinloss

Kincardine

Northern Bruce Peninsula

Saugeen Shores

South Bruce

South Bruce Peninsula

References

Bruce County
Bruce